The Skyline Conference is a college athletic conference based in the New York City area that competes in the NCAA's Division III.

The league was originally chartered on May 16, 1989, as a men's basketball conference and now sponsors 17 sports (nine for men and 8 for women). The Skyline Conference sponsors baseball, men's and women's basketball, men's and women's cross country, men's golf, men's and women's lacrosse, men's and women's soccer, softball, men's and women's swimming and diving, men's and women's tennis, and men's and women's volleyball.

Primarily comprising schools from the New York metropolitan area, the Skyline Conference currently has 11 full-time member schools, as well as five part-time members that compete in men's lacrosse and men's volleyball only.

Prior to the 2007–08 academic year, the league introduced the Skyline Presidents Cup. St. Joseph's (LI) won the first three Presidents Cups (2007–10), followed by Farmingdale State winning in 2010–11. St. Joseph's (LI) collected its fourth Presidents Cup in 2011–12, with Farmingdale State regaining the title in both 2012–13 and 2013–14.

In May 2018, Manhattanville College announced that they would leave the MAC Freedom Conference and return to the Skyline for the 2019–20 academic year.  Manhattanville was a charter member of the Skyline before leaving to join the MAC in 2007.

History

Chronological history
 1989 - On May 16, 1989, the Skyline Conference was founded. Charter members included Manhattanville College, the College of Mount Saint Vincent, the State University of New York at Old Westbury, the State University of New York at Stony Brook and the United States Merchant Marine Academy (Merchant Marine), effective beginning the 1989-90 academic year.
 1993 - Mount Saint Mary College joined the Skyline, effective in the 1993-94 academic year.
 1994 - Stony Brook left the Skyline to join the Division II ranks of the National Collegiate Athletic Association (NCAA) as an NCAA D-II Independent, effective after the 1993-94 academic year.
 1996 - The State University of New York Maritime College joined the Skyline, effective in the 1996-97 academic year.
 1998 - Yeshiva University joined the Skyline, effective in the 1998-99 academic year.
 1999 - St. Joseph's College of New York at Long Island joined the Skyline, effective in the 1999-2000 academic year.
 2000 - Stevens Institute of Technology joined the Skyline, effective in the 2000-01 academic year.
 2003 - Centenary College of New Jersey and the State University of New York of Farmingdale (also known as Farmingdale State College) joined the Skyline, effective in the 2000-01 academic year.
 2006 - Kean University, Montclair State University and Stockton University joined the Skyline as associate members for men's lacrosse, effective in the 2007 spring season (2006-07 academic year).
 2007 - Four institutions had left the Skyline to join their respective new home primary conferences: Centenary (N.J.) to the Pennsylvania Athletic Conference (PAC; now the Colonial States Athletic Conference or CSAC), Manhattanville and Stevens to the MAC Freedom Conference, and U.S. Merchant Marine to the Landmark Conference), effective after the 2006-07 academic year.
 2007 - Bard College, Polytechnic Institute of New York (later the Polytechnic Institute of New York University, or NYU Poly), the State University of New York at Purchase and The Sage Colleges (women's college Russell Sage College and the co-ed Sage College of Albany) joined the Skyline, effective in the 2007-08 academic year.
 2011 - Bard left the Skyline to join the Liberty League, effective after the 2010-11 academic year.
 2011 - New Jersey City University and Ramapo College joined the Skyline as associate members for men's volleyball, effective in the 2012 spring season (2011-12 academic year).
 2014 - NYU Poly left the Skyline to discontinue its athletics program as it was merged into New York University, effective after the 2013-14 academic year.
 2014 - Sarah Lawrence College joined the Skyline, effective in the 2014-15 academic year.
 2015 - St. Joseph's College of New York at Brooklyn joined the Skyline, effective in the 2015-16 academic year.
 2016 - U.S. Merchant Marine re-joined back to the Skyline, effective in the 2016-17 academic year.
 2017 - The Sage Colleges (Russell Sage and Sage (or SCA)) left the Skyline to join the Empire 8, effective after the 2016-17 academic year.
 2017 - New Jersey City and Ramapo left the Skyline as associate members for men's volleyball, effective after the 2017 spring season (2016-17 academic year).
 2019 - Manhattanville re-joined back to the Skyline, effective in the 2019-20 academic year.
 2019 - New Jersey City and Ramapo re-joined back to the Skyline as associate members for men's volleyball, effective in the 2020 spring season (2019-20 academic year).

Member schools

Current members 
The Skyline currently has 12 full members, all but five are private schools:

Notes

Affiliate members
The Skyline currently has five affiliate members, all are public schools:

Notes

Former members
The Skyline had seven former full members, all but one were private schools:

Notes

Membership timeline

 Stony Brook left while reclassifying to Division I and the America East Conference.
 Manhattanville left to join the MAC Freedom Conference.
 Merchant Marine left to join the Landmark Conference and returned in 2016.
 Stevens left to join the Empire 8 Conference; it is now in the MAC Freedom.
 Centenary (NJ) left to join the Pennsylvania Athletic Conference, now known as the Colonial States Athletic Conference
 Bard left to join the Liberty League.
 NYU Poly became affiliated with New York University in 2008, but retained a separate athletic program until it completely merged into NYU in 2014. NYU competes in the University Athletic Association.
 The Kean and Ramapo men's volleyball programs left in 2017 for the Continental Volleyball Conference. Kean remains a men's lacrosse affiliate, and Ramapo returned men's volleyball to the Skyline in 2019.
 New Jersey City men's volleyball left in 2017 for independent status, but returned to the Skyline in 2019.
 The Sage Colleges left in 2017 for the Empire 8. They merged in 2020 and kept the Russell Sage College name.
 Manhattanville left in 2007 for the MAC Freedom and returned in 2019.

Sports

References

External links